Justice Levy may refer to:

Jon D. Levy, associate justice of the Maine Supreme Judicial Court
William M. Levy, associate justice of the Louisiana Supreme Court